Ridgebury may refer to:

Ridgebury Township, Pennsylvania, township in Pennsylvania, USA
Ridgebury, Connecticut, village in Connecticut, USA
Ridgebury, New York, hamlet in Wawayanda, New York, USA